The 37th Vanier Cup was played on December1, 2001, at the SkyDome in Toronto, Ontario, and decided the CIAU football champion for the 2001 season. The Saint Mary's Huskies won their second championship in school history by defeating the Manitoba Bisons by a score of 42–16.

Game summary
Saint Mary's Huskies (42) - TDs, Thibeault, Currie, Perez, Morrison, Tyler; FGs Bartolucci (2); cons., Bartolucci (4); safety touch (1).

Manitoba Bisons (16) - TDs, Miller; FGs Boreham (3); cons., Boreham.

Scoring summary
First Quarter
SMU - FG Bartolucci 32 (4:12)
SMU - TD Thibeault 19 pass from Jones (Bartolucci convert) (7:20)
MAN - FG Boreham 21 (11:52)
SMU - Team Safety (15:00)

Second Quarter
MAN - TD Miller 5 pass from Munson (Boreham convert) (4:43)
MAN - FG Boreham 32 (12:20)
SMU - TD Curry 12 pass from Jones (Two-point convert failed) (13:41)

Third Quarter
SMU - TD Perez 10 run (Bartolucci convert) (9:40)
MAN - FG Boreham 23 (13:22)

Fourth Quarter
SMU - FG Bartolucci 31 (5:15)
SMU - TD Morrison 28 Interception (Bartolucci convert) (5:39)
SMU - TD Tyler 5 pass from Jones (Bartolucci convert) (9:01)

References

External links
 Official website

Vanier Cup
Vanier Cup
2001 in Toronto
December 2001 sports events in Canada
Canadian football competitions in Toronto